The Sitter is a 1991 television film directed by Rick Berger and starring Kim Myers as Nell, an unstable babysitter, who lives in the reality of romance novels. It is a remake of the 1952 Marilyn Monroe film Don't Bother to Knock.

Plot
Nell, a shy and quiet girl, is told that she will babysit a young rich girl at a hotel while the girl's parents attend a party. Nell feels isolated and has unrealistic expectations of love and relationships, based on what she reads in romance novels. She is taken with the little girl, Melissa (Kimberly Cullum). She has her call her "mommy" and gives Melissa a marble that she says is magic. Next, she lets her go with her to a toy store. While on the street, they play "pick a card" with a vendor. He thinks Melissa is cheating and yells at her. Nell yells at the man, saying her "daughter" isn't a cheater. While at the hotel a dog had tried to bite at Melissa, so Nell buys a toy plane. It flies into a back room where the dog chases after it, and the dog is heard whimpering.

While Nell is trying on Melissa's mother's clothes and jewels in the hotel room, Nell sees a handsome man named Jeff (Brett Cullen) across the street. He calls her up for a date. She imagines them married with Melissa as their daughter and two other children. He is interested in Nell but he is taken aback when she starts asking if he loves her.

The film ends with Nell on the ledge of the roof with Melissa and Jeff. He tells her not to hurt Melissa and she lets Melissa go, who drops the marble. Nell runs to the ledge to get it and in her dream world, she's talking to Jeff, Melissa and two other children. She hears him call "Nell? Nell?" The camera pans to the street in front of the hotel where Nell has fallen to her death; she has a smile on her face.

Cast
Kim Myers as Nell
Brett Cullen as Jeff Harper
Kimberly Cullum as Melissa Jones
Susan Barnes as Alice
Susanne Reed as Ruth Jones
James McDonnell as Dennis Jones
Eugene Roch as Carl
Patricia George as Winona
Maria Richwine as Mary
Adolfo Quinones as Nick

External links
 

1991 films
1991 television films
1990s psychological thriller films
Remakes of American films
American television films
1990s thriller drama films
Teen thriller films
1991 drama films
1990s English-language films